Stryphnodendron harbesonii is a species of flowering plant in the family Fabaceae. It occurs in areas of lowland forest up to 150 m. It is found only in the Philippines. It is threatened by habitat loss.

References

harbesonii
Flora of the Philippines
Vulnerable plants
Taxonomy articles created by Polbot